Belkacem is both a given name and a surname. Notable people with the given name or surname include:

Given name
Belkacem Remache (born 1985), Algerian football player
Belkacem Zeghmati (born 1957), Algerian politician
Belkacem Zobiri (born 1983), French-Algerian football player

Surname
Areski Belkacem (born 1940), also known simply as Areski, is a French singer, multi-instrumentalist, comedian and composer
Bensayah Belkacem, Bosnian previously held in the United States Guantanamo Bay detainment camps, in Cuba
Bouteldja Belkacem (1947–2015), Algerian raï songwriter, lyricist and composer
Fouad Belkacem, spokesman of Sharia4Belgium
Krim Belkacem (1922–1970), Algerian revolutionary fighter
Najat Vallaud-Belkacem (born 1977), French socialist politician

See also
Ait Belkacem, commune in the Khémisset Province of the Rabat-Salé-Zemmour-Zaer administrative region of Morocco
Oued Irara–Krim Belkacem Airport, airport serving Hassi Messaoud, a city in the Ouargla Province of eastern Algeria

Arabic-language surnames
Surnames of Algerian origin
Surnames of Moroccan origin